Hạ Lang is a rural district of Cao Bằng province in the Northeast region of Vietnam. As of 2003 the district had a population of 26,330. The district covers an area of 463 km². The district capital lies at Thanh Nhật.

References

Districts of Cao Bằng province